Governor Boyle may refer to:

David Boyle, 7th Earl of Glasgow (1833–1915), 12th Governor of New Zealand from 1892 to 1897
Cavendish Boyle (1849–1916), Acting Governor of British Guiana from 1895 to 1896, Colonial Governor of Newfoundland from 1901 to 1904, and Governor of Mauritius from 1904 to 1911